North Harwich is a village in the town of Harwich in Barnstable County, Massachusetts, United States. The village is located within the census-designated place of Northwest Harwich.

Geography
North Harwich has many cranberry bogs. U.S. Route 6 travels through the area. Great Western Road connects the towns of Dennis, Harwich and Yarmouth. There have been many new developments being constructed in this once isolated part of town, beginning in the late 1980s and continuing into the 2020s. Sand Pond, a public beach, is located in North Hawich. The Cape Cod Fish and Game is located in North Harwich along with a new development of houses. Patriot Square Shopping Center, located close by in the town of Dennis, Massachusetts , has a variety of supermarkets and stores available.

Commercial development
North Harwich has seen much commercial development during the 20th and 21st centuries. The Old North Harwich railroad station site is still there today even though it has since been turned into factories. On Queen Anne Road, multiple warehouses and factories litter the area including the Harwich Town Dump.

Demographics
North Harwich is located in the CDP Northwest Harwich.

References

Harwich, Massachusetts
Villages in Barnstable County, Massachusetts
Villages in Massachusetts